Galmoylestown Upper is a townland in County Westmeath, Ireland.

Galmoylestown Upper is one of 11 townlands of the civil parish of Stonehall in the barony of Corkaree in the Province of Leinster.

The neighbouring townlands are: Martinstown to the north–east, Parsonstown to the south–east, Kilmaglish to the south, Garrysallagh to the south–west, Galmoylestown Lower to the west and Blackmiles to the north.

In the 1911 census of Ireland there was 1 house and 5 inhabitants in the townland.

References

External links
Map of Galmoylestown Upper at openstreetmap.org
Galmoylestown Upper at the IreAtlas Townland Data Base
Galmoylestown Upper at Townlands.ie
Galmoylestown Upper at The Placenames Database of Ireland

Townlands of County Westmeath